Worms may refer to:

Worm, an invertebrate animal with a tube-like body and no limbs

Places
Worms, Germany, a city
Worms (electoral district)
Worms, Nebraska, U.S.
Worms im Veltlintal, the German name for Bormio, Italy

Arts and entertainment
Worms (film),  a 2013 Brazilian animated film
Worms (series), a series of video games, including:
Worms (1995 video game), the first game in the series
Worms (2007 video game), for Xbox Live Arcade, PlayStation Network, and iOS
Worms?, 1983 computer game

Other uses
Worms (infection), common name for Helminthiasis
Parasitic worms (disambiguation)
Worms (surname), a surname
World Register of Marine Species (WoRMS)

See also

Worm (disambiguation)
 Diet of Worms (disambiguation)
Worms & Cie, a French paper company